The Innocence Project is a television drama series created by BBC Northern Ireland and first broadcast on BBC One on 9 November 2006.
The series follows the work of Professor Jon Ford (Lloyd Owen), who sets up The Innocence Project, peopled entirely by a hand-picked group of law students. They take on cases pro bono that no one else will handle, or those that have been forgotten or given up on, working for clients that would otherwise have no hope, and who have possibly been wrongly convicted. The series is based on a British version of the Innocence Project, a non-profit legal clinic in the United States.

The Innocence Project fared particularly poorly for a BBC primetime drama, and received a number of negative reviews. In an unusual move for the BBC, the series was pulled from the schedules mid-run, and the final three episodes were not broadcast until over a month later. The BBC subsequently confirmed that the series would not be renewed. Notably, the series has also never been issued on DVD.

Foundation
The first and best-known Innocence organization is based at the Benjamin N. Cardozo School of Law of Yeshiva University. It directly serves defendants who can conclusively be proven innocent by DNA testing of evidence done after their convictions. The clinic was founded in 1992 by Barry Scheck and Peter Neufeld. In addition to working on behalf of those who may have been wrongfully convicted of crimes throughout the United States, the Innocence Project performs research and advocacy related to the causes of wrongful convictions. The Innocence Project is a member of the recently formed Innocence Network, which brings together a number of innocence organizations from across the United States.

As of 2012, 292 defendants previously convicted of serious crimes in the United States have been exonerated by DNA testing. Almost all of these convictions involved some form of sexual assault and approximately 25% involved murder. Dr. Michael Naughton, founder and director of the Innocence Network UK (INUK), set up the first innocence project in Britain at the University of Bristol in January 2005. Additionally, INUK has actively assisted in setting up over 30 innocence projects in British universities and referred approximately 90 cases to member innocence projects for further investigation.

Cast
 Lloyd Owen — Professor Jon Ford
 Christine Bottomley — Sarah Shawcross
 Ruth Bradley — Beth McNair
 Stephen Graham — Andrew Lucas
 Oliver James — Nick Benitz
 Luke Treadaway — Adam Solomons
 Shelley Conn — Dr. Eve Walker
 Andrea Lowe — Philippa Lucas
 Ruta Gedmintas — Mary Jarvis
 Thomas Turgoose — Darren "Dizzy" Littlewood 
 Charlotte Emmerson — Lizzie Ford

Episodes

See also
The Innocence Project, which refers to a number of non-profit legal clinics in the United States
In Justice, an American TV series with a similar premise

References

External links
 

The Innocence Project TightropePictures.com
The Innocence Project BBC.co.uk

2006 British television series debuts
2007 British television series endings
2000s British drama television series
BBC television dramas
British crime drama television series
2000s British legal television series
Television shows set in Manchester
Wrongful convictions
English-language television shows
2000s British crime television series